Ricky Yiu Poon Fai (born 12 July 1957) is a horse trainer in Hong Kong. He rode 15 winners as a jockey between 1974 and 1981. He received his own training license in 1995/96. In 2010/11 he added 49 winners for a career total of 455. Yiu won the Champion Trainer for the 2019/20 season.

Significant horses
Fairy King Prawn
Sacred Kingdom
Ultra Fantasy
Amber Sky - 2011/12 Best Griffin

Performance

References
 The Hong Kong Jockey Club - Trainer Information
The Hong Kong Jockey Club 

1957 births
Living people
Hong Kong horse trainers